Cabela's Deer Hunt: 2005 Season is the first sequel to Cabela's Deer Hunt: 2004 Season. It was developed by Sand Grain Studios (PlayStation 2), Magic Wand Productions (Windows) and Fun Labs (Xbox)  and released on August 31, 2004.

The game was published by Activision in conjunction with hunting supply company Cabela's.

External links 

2004 video games
PlayStation 2 games
Windows games
Xbox games
Activision games
Video games developed in Romania
Cabela's video games
Fun Labs games
Sand Grain Studios games
Magic Wand Productions games